Hell's Glen is a glen on the Cowal Peninsula, in the Arrochar Alps between the mountains Cruach nam Mult and Stob an Eas.  To the west, it leads to Loch Fyne and to the east, the high mountain Ben Donich.  The glen is within the Argyll Forest Park that is itself within the Loch Lomond and The Trossachs National Park.

The glen is named from its name in Gaelic, Glen Iarainn.  This means "the Iron Glen" but sounds like the nearby Glen Ifhrinn which means "the Glen of Hell." The glen is also known as An Gleann Beag, "the small glen", in Scottish Gaelic.

Moses' Well

On the south-west side of the glen is a group of rocks.  In the 19th century, a local minister constructed a spring in one of the rocks which was named after the incident in Exodus:
This then became a stop at which coaching horses would drink.

References

External links

 Argyll Forest Park - website
 The Loch Lomond and The Trossachs National Park - website

Glens of Scotland
Valleys of Argyll and Bute
Glens of Cowal